Grevillea dimidiata, also known as the caustic bush or willings tree, is a species of flowering plant in the family Proteaceae and is endemic to northern Australia. It is a shrub or small tree with glabrous, more or less sickle-shaped, curved leaves with wavy edges, and cylindrical groups of greenish-white to cream-coloured flowers.

Description
The leaves appear to have only one side, with the mid-vein on one edge of the leaves.

Taxonomy
Grevillea dimidiata was first formally described in 1863 by Ferdinand von Mueller in Fragmenta Phytographiae Australiae from specimens collected by Frederick George Waterhouse near the Roper River during John McDouall Stuart's sixth expedition. The specific epithet (dimidiata) means "divided in half", referring to the leaves.

Distribution and habitat
This grevillea grows in open woodland, scrubland or grassland on rocky or sandy soils and on rocky outcrops and is found between Fitzroy Crossing, Mount Wittenoom and the Joseph Bonaparte Gulf in the Central Kimberley, Northern Kimberley, Ord Victoria Plain and Victoria Bonaparte biogeographic regions of northern Western Australia and north of Wave Hill and Gove in the northern part of the Northern Territory.

Ecology
Caustic bush produces seeds after 4 or 5 years of age. The plant has a typical lifespan of 11 to 20 years and is well adapted to fires in its environment. Adult plants will undergo epicormic resprouting after a fire.

Conservation status
Grevillea dimidiata is listed as "not threatened" by the Western Australian Government Department of Biodiversity, Conservation and Attractions and as of "least concern" under the Northern Territory Government Territory Parks and Wildlife Conservation Act 1976.

References

dimidiata
Flora of the Northern Territory
Eudicots of Western Australia
Proteales of Australia
Taxa named by Ferdinand von Mueller
Plants described in 1863